Yo no fui is an album by Mexican singer Pedro Fernández. It was released on September 12, 2000. The album won the Latin Grammy Award for Best Ranchero Album in 2001.

Track listing

Personnel
Adapted from AllMusic.

 Guadalupe Alfaro – guitar
 Eduardo Arias – make-up
 Juan Manuel Arpero – trumpet
 Chris Bellman – mastering
 Alexis Carreon – viola
 Fernando de Santiago – guitar
 Pedro Fernández – lead vocals
 Stefanie Fife – cello
 Ramon Flores – trumpet
 Virginia Frazier – viola
 Ismael Gallegos – vocals
 Steve Gamberoni – assistant engineer
 Terry Glenny – violin
 Arturo Gutierrez – vocals
 Harry Kim – trumpet
 Bobby Korda – violin
 Joel Lish – viola
 Donald Markese – saxophone
 Arturo Medellin – art direction
 Doug Norwine – saxophone
 Homero Patron – accordion, arranger, keyboards, musical director, vocals
 Fernando Roldán – engineer
 Frank Rosato – engineer
 James Ross – viola
 Ramón Stagnaro – electric guitar
 Nancy Stein-Ross – cello
 David Stout – trombone
 Yolanda Tallavas – coordination
 Ricardo Trabulsi – photography

Sales and certifications

Accolades

References

2000 albums
Pedro Fernández (singer) albums
Universal Music Mexico albums
Latin Grammy Award for Best Ranchero/Mariachi Album